Tamanrasset may refer to:

Tamanrasset, an oasis city
Tamanrasset River, an ancient river
Tamanrasset Province, the largest province in Algeria